Kevin Jubinville (born April 28, 1967) is a Canadian actor known for playing The Shep in Degrassi: The Next Generation and Bob Venton in Rabbit Fall.

Filmography

External links 

1967 births
Living people
20th-century Canadian male actors
21st-century Canadian male actors
Canadian male television actors
Male actors from Kingston, Ontario